Maqsood Rana, (born 1 August 1972) is a former Pakistani cricketer who played single One Day Internationals for Pakistan in 1990. He is a son of former Pakistani cricket umpire Shakoor Rana and brother of Mansoor Rana, Azmat Rana was his uncle.

In February 2021, he began to undertake coaching courses with the Pakistan Cricket Board.

References

External links 

1972 births
Living people
Pakistani cricketers
Pakistan One Day International cricketers
Lahore City A cricketers
Lahore City cricketers
National Bank of Pakistan cricketers
Rawalpindi B cricketers
Lahore Whites cricketers
Pakistan University Grants Commission cricketers